Lio 'On Famör Rotuma or LFR (meaning "Voice of the Rotuman People" in Rotuman) was a political party in Fiji. It sought to represent the interests of the Rotuman people in their main representative constituency, the Rotuman Communal Constituency, which, under the 1997 Constitution, elected a Member of Parliament in the House of Representatives for all people of Rotuman descent across the nation of Fiji. Although the party never won a seat in Parliament, it tightly contested the parliamentary elections of 1999 and 2001.

The party faced some controversy over its short history, primarily related to the mismanagement of funds and donations, and having lost some face did not offer a candidate in the 2006 election.

See also
Politics of Fiji

References 

Defunct political parties in Fiji
Rotuma
Ethnic political parties
Indigenist political parties in Oceania